Edward Maurice Mezvinsky (born January 17, 1937) is an American politician and lawyer from Iowa. He is a former U.S. Representative and felon. A Democrat, he represented Iowa's 1st congressional district in the U.S. House of Representatives for two terms (1973–77).

Mezvinsky grew up in Ames, Iowa, and played high school football there. He graduated from the University of California, Hastings College of the Law (1965). After being elected to the Iowa Legislature (1968), he lost a race for Congress in 1970, then won in 1972 and was re-elected in 1974. He made several unsuccessful U.S. Senate attempts in the 1980s. In 2001, he was convicted of 31 charges of felony fraud, and served five years in federal prison.

In 2010, he became father-in-law to Chelsea Clinton, the daughter of Hillary and Bill Clinton.

Life and career
Mezvinsky grew up in Ames, Iowa, the son of Jewish grocery store owner Abe Mezvinsky. His father was born in Russia and his mother in Poland. He was an all-state football end and member of the Ames High School state championship basketball and track teams of 1955.

Mezvinsky attended the University of Iowa, graduating in 1960. He went on to earn a masters in political science from the University of California, Berkeley in 1963, and a J.D. from the University of California, Hastings College of the Law in 1965. He returned briefly to Iowa to practice law, but quickly began a political career. In 1965, he worked for former Rep. Neal Smith in Washington on lobbyist disclosure and ethics bills. He was elected to the Iowa Legislature in 1968, where he attracted publicity as a consumers' advocate. He lost a 1970 campaign to unseat Republican Congressman Fred Schwengel in Iowa's 1st congressional district by only 765 votes (out of over 120,000 cast). After reapportionment improved his chances, Mezvinsky won a 1972 rematch.

During his first term in Congress, he sat on the House Judiciary Committee and voted for the impeachment of President Richard Nixon for his activities in the Watergate scandal. He was one of eight Democratic members of the committee who voted for all five articles of impeachment drafted against Nixon; three were reported to the House, while two failed.

Although Mezvinsky defeated Davenport businessman Jim Leach in 1974 in the immediate aftermath of the impeachment hearings, Leach defeated him two years later, in 1976. Six months into his first term in Congress, Mezvinsky separated from his wife of ten years Myra Shulman; they were divorced two weeks after his 1974 re-election. During his final term he married Marjorie Margolies, a television journalist. After his 1976 defeat, they relocated to suburban Philadelphia. After serving in Congress, Mezvinsky was United States Ambassador to the United Nations Commission on Human Rights from 1977-79.

Mezvinsky unsuccessfully sought the Democratic nomination for the United States Senate seat held by retiring incumbent Republican Richard Schweiker in 1980, but lost to former Pittsburgh Mayor Pete Flaherty. Flaherty went on to lose the general election by a narrow margin to Republican (later Democrat) Arlen Specter.

Mezvinsky became chairman of the Pennsylvania Democratic Party, and made a run for state attorney general in 1988. He won the Democratic primary, but lost to Republican Ernie Preate in the general election. He also unsuccessfully sought the Democratic nomination for lieutenant governor in 1990, losing to incumbent Mark Singel.

Criminal activities
In March 2001, Mezvinsky was indicted and later pleaded guilty to 31 of 69 felony charges of bank fraud, mail fraud, and wire fraud. Mezvinsky, who had been working as an attorney at the time, was funneling embezzled and fraudulently obtained money to West African con men after falling victim to an online advance-fee scam. In the waning days of the Clinton presidency, before the indictment was handed down, Mezvinsky's wife wrote personally to President Clinton requesting a pardon for her husband. Clinton declined. Nearly $10 million was involved in the crimes. Shortly after Mezvinsky's indictment, he was diagnosed with bipolar disorder, but the judge at his trial disallowed a mental illness defense.

He entered prison in February 2003, and served his time at Federal Prison Camp, Eglin. Mezvinsky, Federal Bureau of Prisons # 55040-066, was released in April 2008, after 5 years. He remained on federal probation until 2011, and  still owed $9.4 million in restitution to his victims.

Family
From 1993–95, Mezvinsky's wife Marjorie Margolies served a term in Congress. Together, they raised eleven children, three of whom were adopted. In 1998, she was the Democratic nominee for lieutenant governor of Pennsylvania. In 2000, she was running for the Democratic nomination for the U.S. Senate when her husband's business problems forced them to file for bankruptcy and forced her abrupt withdrawal. They divorced several years later.

Friendship with the Clintons
During the Clinton administration in the 1990s, Mezvinsky and his wife Marjorie Margolies-Mezvinsky became close to U.S. President Bill Clinton and Hillary Clinton, and were frequent guests at White House state dinners. The two families had met when they attended the annual Renaissance Weekend gathering in South Carolina. President Clinton was reportedly indebted to Margolies-Mezvinsky for providing the crucial vote in the House of Representatives to pass his budget and tax bill in 1993, despite being, as Clinton noted in his autobiography, "one of the very few Democrats who represented a district with more constituents who'd get tax hikes than tax cuts, and in her campaign she'd promised not to vote for any tax increases"; she subsequently lost her bid for re-election in 1994.
 
In 2010 Mezvinsky's son, Marc Mezvinsky, married Chelsea Clinton, daughter of Bill and Hillary.

See also

 List of Jewish members of the United States Congress

References

External links

"Nigerian 'Black Money' Scam Turns Deadly for Two Suspected Con Men", April 1, 2009

1937 births
American Conservative Jews
American people of Polish-Jewish descent
American people of Russian-Jewish descent
American prisoners and detainees
Ames High School alumni
Democratic Party members of the United States House of Representatives from Iowa
Iowa lawyers
Jewish members of the United States House of Representatives
Living people
Democratic Party members of the Iowa House of Representatives
Mezvinsky family
Pennsylvania Democratic Party chairs
Politicians from Ames, Iowa
People with bipolar disorder
Politicians from Philadelphia
Prisoners and detainees of the United States federal government
Representatives of the United States to the United Nations Human Rights Council
University of California, Hastings College of the Law alumni
Jewish American people in Iowa politics
Jewish American people in Pennsylvania politics
American people convicted of fraud